Sun Plaza is a shopping mall in Bucharest, Romania, managed by CBRE Romania and owned by Sparkassen Immobilien AG, under the design of the international firm of architects Chapman Taylor.

The mall has:

 1 hypermarket Cora (11,300 m²)
 1 DIY Leroy Merlin (12,300 m²)
 170 stores - including anchors: Zara, C&A, H&M, Hervis, Humanic, Deichmann, Koton, Flanco. 
 15 screen cinema complex Cinema City 
 fast-foods and restaurants
 kids playground
 games & entertainment
 2,000 underground & deck parking spaces
 more than 3,500 m2 of outdoor terrace (1st floor)
 direct connection from Piata Sudului  metro station by underground passage (June 2010)

References

External links
Sun Plaza Official site

Shopping malls in Bucharest